Navigator's Starcharts is a 1981 role-playing game supplement for Traveller published by Judges Guild.

Contents
Navigator's Starcharts contains enough blank maps to record six complete sectors of 16 subsectors each, for Traveller.

Publication history
Navigator's Starcharts was written by Dave Sering and was published in 1981 by Judges Guild as a 112-page book.

Reception
William A. Barton reviewed Navigator's Starcharts in The Space Gamer No. 43. Barton commented that "Navigator's Starcharts will save you considerable time and expense (unless you have a source of cheap photocopies) in your excursions into stellar cartography."

References

Judges Guild publications
Role-playing game supplements introduced in 1981
Traveller (role-playing game) supplements